BMC Development Team was an American cycling team that acted as a development team for . In July 2017 Jim Ochowicz announced that the team would be disbanded at the end of the season.

Final roster
As at 1 January 2017

Major wins

2013
Overall Tour de Normandie, Silvan Dillier
2014
Overall Tour de Normandie, Stefan Küng
Prologue, Stefan Küng
Stage 3 Tour de Bretagne, Dylan Teuns
Flèche Ardennaise, Stefan Küng
Stage 3 Giro della Valle d'Aosta, Dylan Teuns
Stage 6 Tour de Guadeloupe, Ignazio Moser
2015
Dorpenomloop Rucphen, Floris Gerts
Prologue Tour de Normandie, Tom Bohli
Stage 6 Tour de Normandie, Floris Gerts
Stage 7 Tour de Bretagne, Loïc Vliegen
Tour de Berne, Tom Bohli
Flèche Ardennaise, Loïc Vliegen
Paris–Roubaix Espoirs, Lukas Spengler
Stage 3 Tour des Pays de Savoie, Loïc Vliegen
2016
Giro del Belvedere, Patrick Müller
Stage 1 Le Triptyque des Monts et Châteaux, Bram Welten
Prologue Tour de Berlin, Team time trial
Overall Giro Ciclistico della Valle d'Aosta Mont Blanc, Kilian Frankiny
Stage 1, Team time trial
Stage 4, Kilian Frankiny
2017
 Overall Ronde de l'Isard, Pavel Sivakov
Stages 2 & 4, Pavel Sivakov
 Overall Giro della Valle d'Aosta, Pavel Sivakov
Stage 3, Pavel Sivakov
 Overall Girobio, Pavel Sivakov
 Young rider classification, Pavel Sivakov
Stage 9 Tour de l'Avenir, Pavel Sivakov
Stage 2 Tour Alsace, Jasper Philipsen

References

Cycling teams based in the United States
Cycling teams established in 2013